Joanne ("Jo-Anne") Ritchie (born in Kelowna, British Columbia) is a retired triathlete from Canada.

References

Year of birth missing (living people)
Living people
Canadian female triathletes
Triathletes at the 1995 Pan American Games
Sportspeople from Kelowna
Pan American Games competitors for Canada
20th-century Canadian women